Interferon-induced transmembrane protein 5 is a gene that encodes a membrane protein thought to play a role in bone mineralization. 


Genomics

The gene is located on the short arm of the Crick strand of chromosome 11 (11p15.5). It is located with a cluster of interferon inducible genes but is itself not interferon inducible. The gene is 1,327 bases in length and encodes a protein of 132 amino acids with a predicted molecular weight of 14378 Daltons. Expression in adults is bone specific and highest in osteoblasts.  

The homolog in the mouse is located on chromosome 7. A homolog is also known to be present in lizards.

Evolution

The gene first appeared in bony fish and its bone specific expression appears to be limited to therian mammals.

Biochemistry

The protein has two transmembrane domains. It associates with FK506 binding protein 11.

Clinical

Mutations in the gene are associated with osteogenesis imperfecta type 5.

References

__notoc__
Abnormalities of dermal fibrous and elastic tissue
Skeletal disorders
Collagen disease